Eustace, also rendered Eustis, is the rendition in English of two phonetically similar Greek given names:
Εὔσταχυς (Eústachys) meaning "fruitful", "fecund"; literally "abundant in grain"; its Latin equivalents are Fæcundus/Fecundus
Εὐστάθιος (Eustáthios) meaning "steadfast", "stable"; literally "possessing good stability"; its exact Latin equivalents are Constans and its derivatives, Constantius and Constantinus.  

Equivalents in other languages include Ostap (Ukrainian, Russian), Eustachy (Polish, Russian), Yevstaphiy (Russian), Eustachio (Italian), Eustache or Eustathe (French), Eustaquio (Spanish), Eustáquio (Portuguese), Eustàquio (Valencian), Ustes (Guyanese) and Eustice (English). The originally Hebrew name Ethan or Eitan can also mean "steadfast" or "stable". 

The Greek Eústachys is no longer used; Eustáthios/Ευστάθιος (usually transliterated Efstáthios) on the other hand is still popular and often used in the informal or diminutive Στάθης (Státhis).

Notable people with the name

Given name

Ancient era
Saint Eustace (died 118), Christian martyr
Eustace or Eustathius of Mtskheta (died c. 550), Orthodox Christian saint
Eustace of Luxeuil (Eustasius) (c. 560 – c. 629), saint and Abbot of Luxeuil

Medieval era
Eustace I of Boulogne (died 1049), father of Eustace II
Eustace II of Boulogne (c.  1015–1020 – c. 1087), companion of William the Conqueror, fought at the Battle of Hastings
Eustace III of Boulogne (before 1060 – c. 1125), rebelled against King William II of England, son of Eustace II
Eustace IV of Boulogne (c. 1129 – 1153), eldest son of King Stephen of England
Eustace (Bishop of Ely) (died 1215), Lord Chancellor of England
Eustace de Balliol (died c. 1209), Lord of Balliol
Eustace Chapuys (c. 1490/2 – 1556), Ambassador for the Holy Roman Empire in the English Court during the reign of Henry VIII
Eustace of Fauconberg (died 1228), Bishop of London and Lord High Treasurer
Eustace Folville (died 1346), English outlaw
Eustace fitz John (died 1157), magnate in northern England
Eustace Grenier (died 1123), crusader lord and Constable of the Kingdom of Jerusalem
Eustace the Monk (c. 1170–1217), mercenary and pirate
Eustace de Vesci (1169–1216), English lord of Alnwick Castle, leader of the First Baron's War against King John I of England
Eustace of Vilnius (died 1347), saint and martyr of the Russian Orthodox Church
Eustathius of Ethiopia (1273-1352), Ethiopian saint who advocated for Sabbath observance

Modern era
Eustace Akwei, Ghanaian doctor and politician
Lord Eustace Cecil (1834–1921), British politician
Eustace Conway, American naturalist
Eustace John, Governor-General of Nevis
Eustace Lycett (1914–2006), British special effects artist
Eustace Miles (1868–1948), British real tennis player
Eustace Mullins, American writer
Eustace George Willis, British politician

Surname
Eustace is a Dalcassian surname.

Adam Eustace (born 1979), English rugby union player
Alan Eustace, American computer scientist
Arnhim Eustace (born 1944), Vincentian politician, Prime Minister of Saint Vincent and the Grenadines
Arthur Eustace (born 1926), New Zealand former sprinter, athletics coach and administrator
Bartholomew J. Eustace (1887–1956), American Roman Catholic bishop
Cristina Eustace (born 1979), Mexican singer
Dudley Eustace, English businessman, director of Dutch companies
Frank Eustace (1873–1932), American baseball player
James Eustace, 3rd Viscount Baltinglass (1530–1585), Anglo-Irish Catholic noble rebel
Jean Eustache (1938–1981), French filmmaker
John Chetwode Eustace (c.1762–1815), Anglo-Irish Catholic priest and antiquary
John Eustace (born 1979), English football player
John Thomas Eustace (1825-1919), politician of the Cape Colony
Sir Joseph Lambert Eustace (1908–1996), Vincentian educator, businessman and politician
Katharine Eustace (born 1975), New Zealand skeleton racer
Mary Jo Eustace (born 1962), Canadian actress, singer and sous chef
Peter Eustace (born 1944), English football player
Robert Eustace, pen name of Eustace Robert Barton (1854–1943), English doctor and author
Rowland Eustace, 2nd Viscount Baltinglass (1505–1578), Anglo-Irish Catholic noble
Scott Eustace (born 1975), English footballer
Stuart Eustace (born 1979), English cricketer
Thomas Eustace, 1st Viscount Baltinglass (c.1480–1549), Anglo-Irish Catholic noble loyalist
Tim Eustace (born 1956), American chiropractor and politician

Fictional characters
Eustace Bagge, the farmer from the 1999 TV series Courage the Cowardly Dog
 Sir Eustace Brackenstall, The Adventure of the Abbey Grange by Arthur Conan Doyle
 Eustace Caradoc, Lord Miltoun, in John Galsworthy's novel The Patrician (1911)
Commissioner Eustace Dolan, The Spirit 1940s comic strip character
 Ethne Eustace, The Four Feathers
Eustace Clarence Scrubb, from The Chronicles of Narnia
Eustace Strytch, from The Adventures of Jimmy Neutron: Boy Genius
Eustace Tilley, The New Yorker magazine character
 Eustace Wooster, cousin of Bertie Wooster, in P.G. Wodehouse's The Inimitable Jeeves

See also
Eustice, a surname
Maurice Eustace (disambiguation)

References 

Given names of Greek language origin
English masculine given names 
hu:Euszták